Ian Malcolm may refer to:

Ian Malcolm (character), fictional mathematician from the Jurassic Park series
Sir Ian Zachary Malcolm (1868–1944), British member of Parliament, clan chieftain